I Am Nojoom, Age 10 and Divorced is a 2014 Yemeni drama film directed by Khadija al-Salami. It was selected as the Yemeni entry for the Best Foreign Language Film at the 89th Academy Awards, the first time that Yemen had submitted a film for consideration. However, it was not nominated. The film is based on the story of Nujood Ali, who sought divorce from her abusive husband at age 10.

Plot
Nojoom, a ten year old Yemeni girl, asks a judge in Sana'a to grant her a divorce from a horrible marriage after she was married away to prevent a public scandal following the rape of her sister.

Cast
 Reham Mohammed as Nojoom
 Adnan Alkhader as Judge

See also
 List of submissions to the 89th Academy Awards for Best Foreign Language Film
 List of Yemeni submissions for the Academy Award for Best Foreign Language Film

References

External links
 

2014 films
2014 drama films
Yemeni films
2010s Arabic-language films
Films about pedophilia